Gerald Stanley Zaleski (September 14, 1932 – July 19, 2022) was a Canadian football player who played for the Hamilton Tiger-Cats. He won the Grey Cup with them in 1957. He played college football at Colorado State University.

References

1932 births
2022 deaths
Hamilton Tiger-Cats players
Colorado State University alumni
Colorado State Rams football players
Players of Canadian football from Chicago